Rhaphidophora tetrasperma, the mini monstera, is a species of flowering plant in the family Araceae, genus Rhaphidophora. It is native to Southern Thailand and to Malaysia.

This aroid has often been mistaken for other species and families, as evidenced by some of the above common name used by plant nurseries and retailers. Some of these mistaken identities include: Monstera deliciosa (mistaken for a miniature version), Philodendron sp., and Epipremnum pinnatum, which can all have similar, pinnate foliage, depending on the individual plant's stage of life.

Trivia 
On June 13th, 2021 a single Rhaphidophora tetrasperma with rare white colours was sold in an internet auction on "Trade me" in New Zealand for a record NZ$27,100 (approximately US$19,300.)

References

tetrasperma